The Second cabinet of Mirko Marjanović was elected on 24 March 1998, by the parliament of Serbia. The governing coalition was formed by Socialist Party of Serbia (SPS), Yugoslav Left (JUL), and Serbian Radical Party (SRS). After the signing of Kumanovo Agreement and the entry of NATO forces in the Serbian province of Kosovo and Metohija, all members of the Government from the Serbian Radical Party handed in their resignations, while continuing to perform their duties until the end of term.

Cabinet members

See also
Cabinet of Serbia (2000–01)
Cabinet of Serbia (2001–04)
Cabinet of Serbia (2004–07)
Cabinet of Serbia (2007–08)
Cabinet of Serbia (2008–12)
Cabinet of Serbia (2012–14)
Cabinet of Serbia

References

Serbia
1998 establishments in Serbia
2000 disestablishments in Yugoslavia
Cabinets established in 1998
Cabinets disestablished in 2000